Rodney So'oialo (born 3 October 1979 in Motoʻotua, Samoa) is a New Zealand rugby union player who recently played in Japan for the Honda Heat. He is now the director of rugby and head coach at Trinity College Kandy, Sri Lanka. Previously, he had been a stalwart for the Hurricanes in the Super Rugby competition, making 101 appearances for the franchise. He also made 62 test appearances for the All Blacks between 2002 and 2009. His usual position is at number eight.

Career

In 2001, So'oialo played for the New Zealand Rugby sevens team at the Rugby World Cup Sevens in Mar del Plata, Argentina, which New Zealand won. The next year he was again a member of the New Zealand sevens team, winning gold at the 2002 Commonwealth Games in Manchester.

He made his debut for the All Blacks on 23 November 2002, playing at no. 8 in a match against the Welsh at Millennium Stadium in Cardiff. The following year he started at no.8 for a test against England in June, and then as a reserve in a test against the Springboks in July. So'oialo earned four caps at the 2003 World Cup in Australia, scoring two tries. He was a reserve in the game against Italy in Melbourne, but started at no.8 in the next game against Canada at Telstra Dome, scoring two tries. He played all of the All Blacks' subsequent games at the World Cup.

Although his 2004 season with the Wellington Hurricanes in the Super 12 was disrupted by injury, he was elevated to captain of the National Provincial Championship Wellington side, which reached the final that year. He went on to be called up to the All Blacks for the end of year tests, scoring a try in the game against France in Paris.

His first test in 2005 was against Fiji, scoring a try. He played against the British and Irish Lions during their tour of New Zealand, and went on to gain another sevens caps for the All Blacks during the rest of the year. In 2006, his Super 14 team made it to the final, but were defeated by the Crusaders in a game covered in thick fog (see 2006 Super 14 Final).

He became temporary All Blacks captain during the second test against England on 21 June 2008 when captain Richie McCaw had to go off the field due to breaking an ankle,  So'oialo captained the All Blacks for the first four tests of the 2008 Tri-Nations season, due to Richie McCaw's injury.

He played his 100th game for the Hurricanes against the Queensland Reds on 7 May 2010, a game that was won by the Hurricanes 44–21

After missing the entire 2011 Super Rugby season through injury, he signed in Japan with the Honda Heat for the 2011–12 season.

The Petone Rugby Club in Lower Hutt, Wellington confirmed in January 2014 that Rodney So'oialo has joined the coaching staff of the Petone premier rugby side for the 2014 season. So'oialo will take the Petone forwards alongside head coach Peter Green. Rodney has settled back into the Hutt after playing the last two seasons with the Honda Heat in Japan and is working his way through his IRB Coaching papers. He chose Petone because of its history and traditions and is very keen to see the club perform again at the high levels everyone expects of it.

Personal life 

So'oialo is married to Marilyn.
They have four children together. His older brother is Steven So'oialo (born 1977) who was an international rugby union player for Samoa, as was his youngest brother James So'oialo, who has also represented Samoa internationally. Another of his older brothers is Mimilo (Sam) So’oialo.

References

External links
 Hurricanes profile
 
 2003 World Cup profile

1979 births
New Zealand international rugby union players
Living people
New Zealand rugby union players
Hurricanes (rugby union) players
Mie Honda Heat players
Rugby union number eights
New Zealand sportspeople of Samoan descent
Commonwealth Games gold medallists for New Zealand
Rugby sevens players at the 2002 Commonwealth Games
New Zealand male rugby sevens players
Commonwealth Games rugby sevens players of New Zealand
Wellington rugby union players
New Zealand expatriate rugby union players
Expatriate rugby union players in Japan
New Zealand expatriate sportspeople in Japan
People educated at Mana College
New Zealand international rugby sevens players
Commonwealth Games medallists in rugby sevens
Medallists at the 2002 Commonwealth Games